The Democratic Party of Oregon is the Oregon affiliate of the Democratic Party. The State Central Committee, made up of two delegates elected from each of Oregon's 36 counties and one additional delegate for every 15,000 registered Democrats, is the main authoritative body of the party.

After Oregon was admitted as a state in 1859, Oregon elected twice as many Democrats as Republicans between 1859 and 1879 in statewide elections. It is currently the dominant party in the state, controlling all but two of Oregon's six U.S. House seats, both U.S. Senate seats, both houses of the state legislature, and the governorship.

Platform and Legislative Agenda 

At the beginning of the 2022 short session, House Democrats announced priorities such as addressing homelessness and cost of housing, community safety, education, workforce development and training, childcare, access to health care, and climate change.

Current membership
As of August 2021, there were 1,026,458 registered Democrats in Oregon, compared to 730,113 registered Republicans, and 982,540 registered Non-Affiliated voters.

Organization
As prescribed by Oregon state statutes governing major political parties, the party comprises all registered voters designating their party affiliation as Democrat.  In each biennial primary election conducted in even-numbered years, such affiliated voters elect members from each precinct to their respective county's central committee, which in turn elects delegates to a state convention, charged with organizing the party at the state level, and arranging for the day-to-day conduct of the party. These county central committees also send delegates to the standing committees of their respective congressional districts, which support their constituent county central committees and coordinate district-wide party activities and campaigns.

Officers
 Chair: Carla Hanson (Bio )
 Vice-chair: Pete Lee
 Vice-chair: Rosa Colquitt
 Secretary: Eileen Kiely
 Treasurer: Eddy Morales
 DNC Member: Michelle Risher
 DNC Member: Travis Nelson
 DNC Member: Matt Keating

Party caucuses
The state party recognizes 17 party caucuses formed to address specific political issues in their constituent communities:

 Asian American & Pacific Islanders Caucus
 Black Caucus
 Disability Justice Caucus
 Education Caucus
 Elections Integrity Caucus
 Environmental Caucus
 Gun Owners Caucus
 Health Care Caucus
 Labor Caucus
 Latino Caucus
 Native American Caucus
 Rural Caucus
 Small Business Caucus
 Stonewall Caucus (LGBTQ+)
 Veteran's Caucus
 Women's Caucus
 Young Democrats Caucus

Current elected officials

Members of Congress
Of the seven delegates Oregon sends to the United States Congress, six of them are Democrats.

U.S. Senate
Since 2009, Democrats have held both of Oregon's seats in the U.S. Senate:

U.S. House of Representatives
Democrats hold four of the six seats Oregon is apportioned in the U.S. House of Representatives following the 2020 Census:

Statewide offices
The Oregon Democratic Party holds all five elected state executive offices.

 Commissioner of Labor and Industries: Christina Stephenson (this office is nonpartisan)

Legislative Leadership 

 Senate President: Rob Wagner
 Senate President Pro Tempore: James I. Manning, Jr.
 Senate Majority Leader: Kate Lieber
 Speaker of the House: Dan Rayfield
 Speaker Pro Tempore of the House: Paul Holvey
 House Majority Leader:  Julie Fahey
 House Majority Whip: Andrea Valderrama

Oregon State Legislature

Senate

House of Representatives

History

Territorial period
An initial call for a "thorough and permanent" Democratic Party organization in the Territory of Oregon was sounded by editor Asahel Bush in his Oregon Statesman in June 1851. The highly partisan Bush kept up a relentless drumbeat in his paper against Whig officials and party members, characterizing them as promoters of "monopolies, tariffs, and bank charters [which] fertilize the rich man's soil with the sweat of the poor man's brow." Bush's call was heeded on Independence Day, 1851, with the convocation of a territorial convention at which a central committee was chosen and James Nesmith was made chairman.

"The Democracy" of the pre-Civil War period was supported primarily by farmers, and featured a regular cycle of party activities during the agricultural slack time of winter through spring which included local caucuses, Jackson jubilees, an annual Jefferson-Jackson dinner, county conventions, and Fourth of July bonfires.

The Anti-Democrats of the period, worse organized at the Democrats at the precinct, county, and territorial level, focused upon the issues of temperance and advancing Protestant nativism, marching into elections under three distinct political banners: the People's Party in 1853; the Whig and American party in 1855; and the Republican, Independent, and Maine Law in 1857. Their comparatively superior system of party organization led to Democratic dominance in the pre-statehood period, although factionalism revolving around control over federal appropriations and patronage left the Democratic majority party anything but a united organization.

Early statehood period

The party's first convention post-statehood was held in Salem on April 20, 1859. Bitterly divided over the issue of slavery,
the convention nominated Lansing Stout, supported by pro-slavery factions led by Joseph Lane, for the United States House of Representatives over incumbent Democrat La Fayette Grover. Democratic control of the state legislature between 1859 and 1879 resulted in the selection of eight Democrats as US senators, and only three Republicans were chosen. Beginning in the 1880s the Democrats became the minority party when immigrants from Wisconsin, Michigan, Minnesota and foreign countries moving over to Oregon chose the Republican Party as their main party.

With the start of the 1880s the Democrats had become the minority, and that stayed that way, for the most part, until the start of World War II. During those years however there were a few blips such as 1890 that had the Democrats back on the political map. The adoption of the direct primary gave the Democrats new forms of institutional democracy which lead the way for political advancement. The people of Oregon had a new way of thinking about politics and the Democrats started to use the reform-minded mentality that existed in some of the populous to overturn the Republican control of state politics.

Democratic reform

The Democrats first started to make alliances with third parties in the 1890s but then moved on to market themselves as a partisan organization. The governor at the time, Sylvester Pennoyer, gathered a coalition with a start-up party called the Union Party and independent Republicans from Portland. Pennoyer won his re-election bid and this gave Democrats the confidence they were looking for to beat the Republicans, but the Republicans swept the rest of the state with the exception of a couple of seats in the state legislature. Pennoyer warned both parties of a third party rising due to lack of acknowledgment of political problems that faced the nation. He was correct as the People's Party emerged in Omaha. Pennoyer was agitated with the platforms of both parties that he left and joined the Populists. This created a split in the party between people who wanted to follow Pennoyer to the People's Party and the people who wanted to stay as Democrats.

The refusal of the People's Party to join forces with the Democratic Party led to easy elections for Republicans in the years to come. In 1896 factionalism between these parties led the Republicans carrying Oregon in the Presidential and Congressional elections. State legislature elections resulted in the Populist leading the Democrats in elected members 18–7. The only meaningful victory that the Democrats could look to was that of Sylvester Pennoyer, who returned to the Democratic ticket and won the election for mayor, being supported by the Democrats and Populists together. The only other Democratic success was that the people of Oregon responded to the call to reform as the Democrats took 12 counties from the Republicans in that presidential election.

The Great Depression and the re-emergence of the Democrats

Between 1900 and 1932 the Republicans enjoyed a two-one ratio over the Democrats, and sometimes three-one. There was no real changed even during the Franklin D. Roosevelt years where the Republican registration never dipped below 50% throughout the state. This remained the case until the boom in employment caused by World War II. This resulted in a drastic increase in Oregon population, which benefited the Democratic party. Workers that came in provided a base to rebuild the Democratic Party.

As the Great Depression struck the nation in the 1930s the Oregon Democrats saw this as an opportunity to gain prominence once again.  The people of the state reacted very strongly against the Republican leadership that was in power during the economic collapse that spark the depression. Party officials believed that this collapse finally gave the party a concrete issue and they also believed that they would be able to make Oregon a two-party state once again. The state committee organized meetings between 1930 and 1932 to plan precinct reorganization throughout the state, and shortly after the spike in meetings, a "Young Democratic League" was formed with an active membership of 2,500 members and they were scattered throughout all of the counties of Oregon. This also ended the avoidance by candidates of the Democratic label as the public saw the Republicans as responsible for the collapse, so the Democrats put themselves out as the party of new ideas.  They viewed the label of Democrat as an advantage, as the national Democratic party saw a rise in popularity. As the Oregon Democrats ran in tandem with Roosevelt in the Presidential election, they saw instant results, the Democrats gained 10 seats  the state legislature, going from 7 to 17 and gaining majority in a 30-seat legislature, and in the state senate going from 1 seat to 8, giving an even split in the state senate. These were not the biggest successes for Oregon Democrats however, Charles H. Martin won reelection in the Third Congressional District and Walter Pierce won the Second Congressional District for the first time in Oregon history. In the 1930s, there was a drastic increase in voter registration for the Democrats, whose numbers rise from 30 percent of state registered voters to 48%, most of this was because of support for FDR's "New Deal". Roosevelt was solid in Oregon for his four election victories, never once losing the state, but the same could not be said for state Democrats. They were never able to win a senate seat and after the initial Roosevelt election year; the state Democrats did not gain any more congressional seats that were significant.

The fall of the Democrats
The rise of the Democrats was short-lived during this period and the fall can be attributed to the gubernatorial election of former congress member, Democrat Charles H. Martin. Martin ran and won the Governorship as a "champion" of the "New Deal" brought to fruition by Roosevelt. After the election it became clear that Martin did not support the President or his "New Deal" and this sparked a war between the Democratic state legislature and Martin. He received most of his troubles from the Democrats and gained support from Republicans. Martin was all but kicked out of the Democratic Party as many of his former supporters stated that they would no longer support him if he ran for governorship again. Despite this Martin declared that he would run again for governor because of promised support from Republicans. Martin lost his reelection bid in the primary to Democrat State Senator Henry Hess. This ended up splitting the party once again and Hess lost the general election for governor. Martin endorsed many Republicans that ran against incumbent Democrats, leading to the loss of majority in both the State House and Senate, plus the loss of the Third Congressional district.

Post World War II rebuilding of the party
After the war, there was no trace of a Democratic Party anywhere in Oregon, so a reorganization effort was started. The biggest triumph in the initial rebuilding was when Monroe Sweetland ran as a candidate for National Committeeman, and then won the seat in the 1948 primaries. Sweetland sought to gain connections to the Harry S. Truman administration and eventually succeeded in his goal. This resulted in the now upstart Democratic presence in Oregon receiving monetary contributions from Democratic figures. This was the one real success in the 1948 election however as the Democrats in the state failed to come up with viable strong candidates for office. Once Sweetland saw this, he decided to launch strong campaigns for Truman in the state, that also was unsuccessful as Dewey carried the state, but not the presidency. They did however elect some Democrats to smaller positions in the state legislature. There was no apparent hope for the Democrats until the following election year 1950, when Democrats saw an increase and surpassing of Democratic registration over the Republicans. The 1950 election was as big a disaster as the 1948 election as the Democrats still won no prominent seats in the state, but in 1952 the Democrats ended up seizing the Attorney General Position from the Republicans, which was seen as a major victory for the Democrats of the state. 1954 was the first time in a long time that Democrats had a sound hold on Oregon Politics, they saw an increase in State Legislature seats, increasing from 11 to 25 and in the Senate increasing from 4 to 6. They also won the first US Senatorial election in 40 years when Richard Neuberger defeated Republican incumbent Guy Cordon, and Edith Green captured Third Congressional District in an open-seat race against future governor Tom McCall. Finally, in 1956 it was clear that the Democrats were back in power when they took 3 of 4 races for US Representative, a reelection of the Attorney General, a gain of control over the State Legislature, and a victory for Governor of Oregon.

Recent elections

2006 elections
Going into the 2006 elections, Democrats occupied all four of the state's partisan executive offices and held a majority in the Oregon State Senate, but were in the minority in the Oregon House of Representatives.  Of the statewide office-holders, only Governor Ted Kulongoski was up for re-election.  Not only was he successful in that bid, but Democrats were elected to a slim majority in the House.  All four of Oregon's Democratic United States House representatives were re-elected.

2008 elections
In the 2008 elections, Democrats gained a three-fifths majority in the state house and maintained the same majority in the senate despite losing a seat to the Republicans. This majority in both chambers of the Oregon Legislative Assembly is needed to pass bills that raise revenue, as required by Article IV §25 of the state constitution. Democrats maintained control of all state partisan executive offices. They held all four of Oregon's five federal congressional seats, including a retiring Democrat's seat, and unseated Oregon's Republican senator, the only one from the West Coast and the only Republican occupying an office representing the whole of Oregon.

2010 elections
In 2010 the Democrats kept the Governorship in a close election decided by the slimmest of margins. Former 2-term governor John Kitzhaber defeated Republican Chris Dudley by a mere 14,910 votes. US Senator Ron Wyden kept his senate seat, handily beating Jim Huffman 57% to 39%. The Democratic Party of Oregon also kept all four of their previously held congressional seats in the U.S House of Representatives

Election results

Presidential

Gubernatorial

See also

 List of political parties in Oregon

Footnotes

Further reading

 Robert E. Burton, Democrats of Oregon: the Pattern of the Minority Politics, 1900-1956. Eugene, OR: University of Oregon Press, 1970.

External links
 Democratic Party of Oregon

 
Political parties in Oregon
Oregon Democratic Party
1851 establishments in Oregon Territory
Political parties established in 1851